Ariel Massengale (born 10 June 1993) is an American professional basketball player.

Career

College
Massengale played college basketball at the University of Tennessee in Knoxville, Tennessee for the Lady Volunteers.

Tennessee statistics

Source

WNBA
In the 2015 WNBA Draft, the Atlanta Dream selected Massengale in the third round as the twenty ninth pick overall. Massengale sat out the 2015 season, to rehab a knee injury. In 2016, Massengale returned to the league and made her professional debut with the Dream. However soon after, Massengale was released by the Dream.

Europe
Massengale headed to Europe, to play in Finland's Naisten Korisliiga with the Catz Lappeenranta for the 2016–17 season. After playing in twelve games, Massengale was released.

National Team

Youth level
Massengale made her international debut at the 2009 FIBA Americas Under-16 Championship in Mexico. She would then go on to represent the USA at both the 2010 FIBA Under-17 World Cup and the 2011 FIBA Under-19 World Cup, taking home the gold on both occasions. At the Under-19 World Cup, she earned a spot on the All-Tournament Team, alongside teammate Breanna Stewart.

References

1993 births
Living people
American women's basketball players
Atlanta Dream draft picks
Basketball players from Illinois
Guards (basketball)
McDonald's High School All-Americans
People from Downers Grove, Illinois
Tennessee Lady Volunteers basketball players
Universiade medalists in basketball
Universiade gold medalists for the United States
Medalists at the 2013 Summer Universiade